5 Squadron or 5th Squadron may refer to:

Aviation squadrons:
 No. 5 Squadron RAAF, a unit of the Royal Australian Air Force
 No. 5 Squadron RCAF, a unit of the Royal Canadian Air Force
 No. 5 Squadron RNZAF, a unit of the Royal New Zealand Air Force
 No. 5 Squadron PAF, a unit of the Pakistan Air Force
 No. 5 Squadron SLAF, a unit of the Sri Lanka Air Force
 5 Squadron SAAF, a unit of the South African Air Force
 No. 5 Squadron RAF, a unit of the United Kingdom Royal Air Force 
 5th Special Operations Squadron, a unit of the United States Air Force 
 5th Space Operations Squadron, a unit of the United States Air Force 
 5th Space Launch Squadron, a unit of the United States Air Force

Naval squadrons:
 5th Battle Squadron, a formation of the United Kingdom Royal Navy 

Ground combat squadrons:
 2/5th Commando Squadron (Australia), a unit of the Australian Army

See also
 Squadron No. 5, a 1939 Soviet film